The king of Akkad (Akkadian:) was the ruler of the city of Akkad and its empire, in ancient Mesopotamia. In the 3rd millennium BC, from the reign of Sargon of Akkad to the reign of his great-grandson Shar-Kali-Sharri, the Akkadian Empire represented the dominant power in Mesopotamia and the first known great empire.

The empire would rapidly collapse following the rule of its first five kings, owing to internal instability and foreign invasion, probably resulting in Mesopotamia re-fracturing into independent city-states, but the power that Akkad had briefly exerted ensured that its prestige and legacy would be claimed by monarchs for centuries to come. Ur-Nammu of Ur, who founded the Neo-Sumerian Empire and reunified most of Mesopotamia, created the title "King of Sumer and Akkad" which would be used until the days of the Achaemenid Empire.

History 

Although Sargon of Akkad is often referred to as the "founder" of Akkad, the city itself probably existed before his rule; a pre-Sargonic inscription refers to it by name and the name "Akkad" itself is not actually of the Akkadian language of Sargon and his successors. Sargon's reign does however mark the transition of Akkad from a city-state into the first known great empire, with the Akkadian king ruling all Mesopotamia. His rise to power began with the defeat of the Sumerian king Lugal-zage-si, who had ruled Lower Mesopotamia from Uruk, and the conquest of his empire. Through military campaigns, Sargon subjugated regions as far west as the Mediterranean and as far north as Assyria, which he boasted of in his inscriptions.

Sargon's successors consolidated his vast realm and continued expanding the borders of the Akkadian Empire. Sargon's grandson and the fourth king of Akkad, Naram-Sin, brought the empire to its greatest extent and assumed a new title to illustrate his great power, King of the Four Quarters, which referenced the entire world. He was also the first king in Mesopotamia to be deified in his lifetime, being addressed as "the god of Akkad".

Although at least seven kings would rule Akkad after him, the Akkadian Empire quickly collapsed after Naram-Sin's reign and prominent central authority under a single king would not be restored in Mesopotamia until the rise of the Neo-Sumerian Empire. It's likely that the region reverted to local governance under kings of city-states in the time between the two empires. A major cause of this collapse was the invasion of Mesopotamia by a people referred to as the Gutians, who would be defeated and driven away by the founder of the Neo-Sumerian Empire, Ur-Nammu.

Kings of Akkad

Sargonic dynasty (c. 2334 – 2193 BC)

Akkadian interregnum (c. 2193 – 2189 BC)

Final kings of Akkad (c. 2189 – 2154 BC) 
The final kings to rule Akkad, Dudu and Shu-turul are assumed to have been related to the original ruling dynasty and as such are often regarded as members of the Sargonic dynasty.

King of Sumer and Akkad 

Although Akkad and what remained of its empire was destroyed, its power and prominence led to rulers of later Mesopotamian empires wishing to claim its prestige and legacy for themselves. Ur-Nammu, who founded the Neo-Sumerian Empire in the aftermath of the Gutian rule of Mesopotamia assumed the title "King of Sumer and Akkad". Although the title was meant to justify his rule over both southern (Sumer) and northern (Akkad) Mesopotamia, it also clearly connected Ur-Nammu to the old Akkadian kings, who may have been against linking Sumer and Akkad in such a fashion even though they had ruled both regions.

Ur-Nammu's title would endure for more than 1,500 years. It was assumed by Hammurabi, founder of the Old Babylonian Empire, and used by Babylonian kings up until the 8th century BC. It was also prominently used in the Middle and Neo-Assyrian Empires and in the Neo-Babylonian Empire. For Assyrian kings, "King of Sumer and Akkad" was used as a marker of their control of Babylon (which was in the South, e.g. Sumer) and only those Assyrian kings who actually controlled Babylon used the title in their inscriptions.

The final king to assume the title of "King of Sumer and Akkad" was Cyrus the Great of the Achaemenid Empire, who reigned from 559 to 530 BC. In the Cyrus Cylinder, written in Akkadian cuneiform script following Cyrus's conquest of Babylon, he assumed several traditional Mesopotamian royal titles, most of which were not used by his successors.

References

Citations

Cited bibliography

Websites 

 

Akkad
Akkadian Empire
Akkadian kings